Faas is a 2022 Marathi drama film directed by Avinash Kolte and produced by MA Film Entertainment. The film shows the difficulties and problems in social life faced by a farmer.

The film is produced by Maheshwari Patil Chakurkar and co-produced by Naresh Patil, Pallavi Palkar, Dayanand Avarade, Basavraj Patil, Anil Patil, Vaihali Paddevad.

Cast 

 Upendra Limaye 
 Kamlesh Sawant
 Sayaji Shinde
 Pallavi Palkar
 Ganesh Chandanshive
 Namdev Patil
 Nikesh Bade
 Dnyanesh Undagavkar
 Umesh Rajhans 
 Sharad Kakade
 Ishwar More
 Pawan Vaidya
 Vinay Joshi
 Deva Pandey 
 Pooja Tayde

Soundtrack 

Music is composed by Alan K.P and Lyrics is written by Amol Deshmukh. Songs are recorded by Avdhoot Gupte, Sheikh Nishant, Adarsh Shinde, Vaishali Samant and Shubhagi Kedar.

References

External links 
 

2020s Marathi-language films
Indian drama films
2022 drama films